The John Florio Prize for Italian translation is awarded by the Society of Authors,
with the co-sponsorship of the Italian Cultural Institute and Arts Council England. Named after the Tudor Anglo-Italian writer-translator John Florio, the prize was established in 1963. As of 1980 it is awarded biannually for the best English translation of a full-length work of literary merit and general interest from Italian.

Winners and shortlistees

1960s 
 = winner

1963 
Donata Origo, for The Deserter by Giuseppe Dessi
Eric Mosbacher, for Hekura by Fosco Maraini

1964 
Angus Davidson, for More Roman Tales by Alberto Moravia
Professor E. R. Vincent, for A Diary of One of Garibaldi's Thousand by Giuseppe Cesare Abba
H. S. Vere-Hodge, for The Odes of Dante

1965 
W. H. Darwell, for Dongo: The Last Act by Pier Luigi Bellini delle Stelle & Urbano Lazzaro

1966 
Stuart Woolf, for The Truce by Primo Levi
Jane Grigson and Father Kenelm Foster, for The Columns of Infamy of Crime and Punishments by Cesare Beccaria

1967 
Isabel Quigly, for The Transfers by Silvano Ceccherini

1968 
Muriel Grindrod, for The Popes in the 20th Century by Carlo Falconi
Raleigh Trevelyan, for The Outlaws by Luigi Meneghello

1969 
Sacha Rabinovitch, for Francis Bacon: from Magic to Science by Paolo Rossi
William Weaver, for A Violent Life by Pier Pasolini

1970s

1970 
Angus Davidson, for On Neoclassicism by Mario Praz

1971 
William Weaver, for The Heron by Giorgio Bassani and Time and the Hunter by Italo Calvino

1972 
Patrick Creagh, for Selected Poems by Giuseppe Ungaretti

1973 
Bernard Wall, for Wrestling with Christ by Luigi Santucci

1974 
Stephen M. Hellman, for Letters from Inside the Italian Communist Party by Maria Antonietta Macciocchi

1975 
Cormac O’Cuilleanain, for Cagliostro by Roberto Gervaso

1976 
Frances Frenaye, for The Forests of Norbio by Giuseppe Dessi

1977 
Ruth Feldman & Brian Swann, for Shema, Collected Poems of Primo Levi

1979 
Quintin Hoare, for Selections from Political Writings 1921-26 by Antonio Gramsci

1980s

1980 
Julian Mitchell, for Henry IV by Pirandello

1982 
Christopher Holme, for Ebla: An Empire Rediscovered by Paolo Matthiae

1984 
Bruce Penman, for China (The moments of civilisation) by Gildo Fossati

1986 
Avril Bardoni, for The Wine Dark Sea by Leonardo Sciascia

1988 
J. G. Nichols, for The Colloquies by Guido Gozzano

1990s

1990 
Patrick Creagh, for Danube by Claudio Magris
Patrick Creagh, for Blind Argus by Gesualdo Bufalino

1992 
William Weaver, for The Dust Roads of Monferrato by Rosetta Loy
Tim Parks, for Sweet Days of Discipline by Fleur Jaeggy

1994 
Tim Parks, for The Road to San Giovanni by Italo Calvino

1996 
Emma Rose, for His Mother's House by Marta Morazzoni

1998 
Joseph Farrell, for Take-Off by Daniele del Giudice

2000s

2000 
Martin McLaughlin, for Why Read the Classics? by Italo Calvino

2002 
Stephen Sartarelli, for Prince of the Clouds by Gianni Riotta
Alastair McEwen, for Senior Service by Carlo Feltrinelli

2004 
Howard Curtis, for Coming Back by Edoardo Albinati

2006 
  Carol O’Sullivan and Martin Thom, for Kuraj by Silvia Di Natale
Runner-up: Aubrey Botsford, for The Ballad of the Low Lifes by Enrico Remmert

2008 
  Peter Robinson, for The Greener Meadow by Luciano Erba
Runner-up: Alastair McEwen, for Turning Back the Clock by Umberto Eco

2010s

2010 
  Jamie McKendrick, for The Embrace: Selected Poems by Valerio Magrelli
Runner-up: Abigail Asher, for The Natural Order of Things by Andrea Canobbio

2012 
  Anne Milano Appel, for Scent of a Woman by Giovanni Arpino
Commended: Howard Curtis, for In the Sea There are Crocodiles by Fabio Geda

Commended: Shaun Whiteside, for Stabat Mater by Tiziano Scarpa

2014 
  Patrick Creagh, for Memory of the Abyss by Marcello Fois
Commended: Cristina Viti, for A Life Apart by Mariapia Veladiano

2016 
  Jamie McKendrick, for Archipelago by Antonella Anedda
Commended: Richard Dixon, for Numero Zero by Umberto Eco

2018 
  Winner: Gini Alhadeff for her translation of I Am the Brother of XX by Fleur Jaeggy (And Other Stories)

Runner-up: Cristina Viti for her translation of Stigmata by Gëzim Hajdari (Shearsman Books)

Shortlistees: 
Jamie McKendrick for his translation of Within the Walls by Giorgio Bassani (Penguin Classics)
Mario Petrucci for his translation of Xenia by Eugenio Montale (Arc Publications)
Cristina Viti for her translation of The World Saved by Kids by Elsa Morante (Seagull Books)

2020s

2020 
  Winner: Jhumpa Lahiri for her translation of Trick by Domenico Starnone (Europa Editions)

Runner-up: Jenny McPhee for her translation of The Kremlin Ball by Curzio Malaparte (New York Review Books)

Shortlistees:

 Anne Milano Appel for a translation of A Devil Comes to Town by Paolo Maurensig (World Editions)
 Ekin Oklap for a translation of Flowers Over the Inferno by Ilaria Tuti (Weidenfeld & Nicolson)
 Taije Silverman and Marina Della Putta Johnson for a translation of Selected Poems of Giovanni Pascoli by Giovanni Pascoli (Princeton University Press)
 Howard Curtis for a translation of Soul of the Border by Matteo Righetto (Pushkin Press)

2022 
  Winner: Nicholas Benson and Elena Coda for a translation of My Karst and My City by Scipio Slataper (University of Toronto Press)

Runner-up: J Ockenden for a translation of Snow, Dog, Foot by Claudio Morandini (Peirene Press)

Runner-up: Tim Parks for a translation of The House on The Hill and The Moon and the Bonfires by Cesare Pavese (Penguin)

Shortlistees:

 Elena Pala for a translation of The Hummingbird by Sandro Veronesi (Weidenfeld & Nicolson)
 Stash Luczkwi for a translation of Without Ever Reaching the Summit by Paolo Cognetti (Harvill Secker)
 Stephen Twilley for a translation of Diary of a Foreigner in Paris by Curzio Malaparte (New York Review Books)

References

Awards established in 1963
Translation awards
Society of Authors awards